West Virginia Route 218 (WV 218) is a north–south state highway located in Marion and Mononagalia counties in northern West Virginia, United States, that connects U.S. Route 19 (US 19) with the Pennsylvania state line.

Route description

WV 218 begins at a junction with US 19, in Marion County, just east of Worthington (north and east of the West Fork River). From its southern terminus it the route runs northerly along Helens Run for about  until it reaches Idamay.

Within the town of Farmington, WV 218 runs easterly for a short  along the south bank of the Buffalo Creek and concurrent with US 250 before heading north. After running a short distance along the west bank, the route crosses that stream just above its confluence with Little Dunkard Mill Run Heading north the route crosses Little Dunkard Mill Run and then continues northerly for about  along the streams east bank, past its headwaters, until it turns easterly and reaches Basnetteville. (From just south of Dunkard Mill Run to Basnettville, WV 281 is also known as Jamison Road.)

Once it reaches Fairview, the route is signed as Main Street, until it crosses Bennefield Prong and turns north again. Continuing northerly, and signed as Jefferson Street (until it leaves Fairview), the route crossed back over Bennefield Prong and the runs along its east bank. North of Fairview the route is named Daybrook Road. It runs northerly and then northeasterly until it leaves Marion County and enters Monongalia County.

Continuing northeasterly along the east bank of Bennefield Prong (and still signed as Daybrook Road), WB 218 passes the stream's headwaters turn north once again to run northerly until it reaches the south bank of Dunkard Creek, Just east of Blacksville. The route then turns west to run concurrently with West Virginia Route 7 (WV 7/Mason-Dixon Highway). A few blocks after entering Blacksville, the route turns north one more time, ending its concurrency with WV 7. Continuing northerly (and again named Daybrook Road), the route arrives at its northern terminus at the northern city limits of Blacksville within a few more blocks. The city limits are at the West Virginia-Pennsylvania state line (which is also the Mason-Dixon line). The road continues north as Pennsylvania Route 218 towards Spraggs and Waynesburg.

Major intersections

See also

 List of state highways in West Virginia
 List of highways numbered 218

References

External links

218
Transportation in Marion County, West Virginia
Transportation in Monongalia County, West Virginia